Hohenfels may refer to:

Place names
 Hohenfels, Konstanz municipality in Landkreis Konstanz in Baden-Württemberg, near Stockach
 Hohenfels, Bavaria municipality in Landkreis Neumarkt in Oberpfalz in Bavaria.
 suburb of Albbruck in Landkreis Waldshut in Baden-Württemberg
 suburb of Hohenfels-Essingen in Landkreis Vulkaneifel in Rheinland-Pfalz

Castles
 Château de Hohenfels in the municipality of Dambach in the Alsace, France
 Hohenfels Castle (Allendorf) in the municipality of Dautphetal in Hesse, Germany
 Hohenfels Castle (Upper Palatinate) in the municipality of Hohenfels, Bavaria, Germany
 Hohenfels Castle (Hohenfels) in the municipality of Hohenfels, Konstanz, Baden-Württemberg, Germany
 Hohenfels Castle (Palatinate) in the municipality of Imsbach, Rhineland-Palatinate, Germany
 Hohenfels Castle (Sipplingen) in the municipality of Sipplingen, Baden-Württemberg, Germany

Villa
 Villa Hohenfels in Vienna

Families
 Burkart von Hohenfels
 Stella Freifrau von Hohenfels-Berger (1857−1920)
 House of Hohenfels (Hesse), a Hessian noble family